Juan de la Cruz Fernández Miranda (born November 11, 1974 in Buenos Aires, Argentina) is an Argentine former rugby union footballer and a current coach. He played as a fly-half and as a centre.

He won 29 caps for Argentina, from 1997 to 2007. He made his international test debut at the age of 22 on 27 September 1997 against Uruguay. He scored 165 points for Argentina including 5 tries. He played most of his career for the Hindú Club in Argentina, and the Buenos Aires Representative Team, where he was in charge of the strategic management of Hindú Club and the Buenos Aires representative team alongside his older brother, fellow Puma Nicolás Fernández Miranda. He was also an active sevens player and has represented Argentina in five tournaments. He finished his player career in 2009, becoming Hindú Club coach afterwards.

Juan Fernández Miranda was awarded the prestigious  Olimpia de Plata for Rugby in 1997. He went to represent Argentina at the 1999 Rugby World Cup finals and the 2003 Rugby World Cup finals.

External links
 

1974 births
Living people
Argentine rugby union players
Argentine rugby union coaches
Hindú Club players
Rugby union fly-halves
Rugby union centres
Rugby union players from Buenos Aires
Argentina international rugby union players
Argentina international rugby sevens players